The 1973–74 season was the 72nd season in which Dundee competed at a Scottish national level, playing in Division One, where the club would finish in 5th place for the fourth consecutive season. Domestically, Dundee would also compete in both the Scottish League Cup and the Scottish Cup, where they would get knocked out by Celtic in semi-finals of the Scottish Cup for the second straight year, but would defeat them to win the club's third League Cup. Despite the issues such as a miners' strike and blizzards causing attendances for games to be uncharacteristically low, a Gordon Wallace goal would give Dundee its fifth major title. Dundee would also compete in the UEFA Cup, where they would be knocked out by FC Twente in the 1st round.

Scottish Division One 

Statistics provided by Dee Archive.

League table

Scottish League Cup 

Statistics provided by Dee Archive.

Group 3

Group 3 table

Knockout stage

Scottish Cup 

Statistics provided by Dee Archive.

UEFA Cup

Player statistics 
Statistics provided by Dee Archive

|}

See also 

 List of Dundee F.C. seasons

References

External links 

 1973-74 Dundee season on Fitbastats

Dundee F.C. seasons
Dundee